In mathematics, a catholic semigroup is a semigroup in which no two distinct elements have the same set of inverses. The terminology was introduced by B. M. Schein in a paper published in 1979. Every catholic semigroup either is a regular semigroup or has precisely one element that is not regular, much like the partitioners of most Catholic churches. The semigroup of all partial transformations of a set is a catholic semigroup. It follows that every semigroup is embeddable in a catholic semigroup. But the full transformation semigroup on a set is not catholic unless the set is a singleton set. Regular catholic semigroups are both left and right reductive, that is, their representations by inner left and right translations are faithful. A regular semigroup is both catholic and orthodox if and only if the semigroup is an inverse semigroup.

See also
Special classes of semigroups
Orthodox semigroup

References

Semigroup theory